Roberto Bautista Agut was the defending champion, but withdrew before the tournament began.

Tennys Sandgren won his first title on the ATP Tour, defeating Cameron Norrie in the final, 6–4, 6–2.

Seeds
The top four seeds received a bye into the second round.

Draw

Finals

Top half

Bottom half

Qualifying

Seeds

Qualifiers

Lucky loser

Qualifying draw

First qualifier

Second qualifier

Third qualifier

Fourth qualifier

References

External links
 Main Draw
 Qualifying Draw

2019 Men's Singles
2019 ATP Tour
2019 in New Zealand tennis